Freeman's Mind is a machinima series created by Ross Scott using the Source remake of the 1998 video game Half-Life. It follows the protagonist of the game, Gordon Freeman, also voiced by Scott, who acts as a combination of narrator and running commentary, often criticizing and satirizing the game world's conventions in a style similar to that in Mystery Science Theater 3000. The series ran from 2007 to 2014 and consists of 71 episodes (including episode 0 and two bonus episodes). A sequel series, titled Freeman's Mind 2, debuted in 2017, and is ongoing with 71 episodes in total.

Author
Ross Scott was born in Baton-Rouge, Louisiana, but grew up mostly in Virginia. After having studied criminal psychology, and done odd jobs such as being a night watchman, a helper of the entomology department of Virginia Tech, or part of the technical support for an Internet service provider, Ross Scott created the Freeman's Mind series, about eight years after the release of the game. He was briefly involved with the company Machinima, yet ties were later cut between the two. Ross Scott eventually emigrated to Gdańsk, Poland where he was later married.

Character differences
While the character profile behind the character Gordon Freeman remains mostly the same, he takes on a vastly different personality from the "blank slate" silent protagonist of the original plot. In Freeman's Mind, Gordon is portrayed as an extremely neurotic, selfish, egocentric individual with a history of drug abuse and racketeering, among other juvenile offenses. Gordon's thoughts often consist of his superiority to his colleagues, critiques of the Black Mesa complex, and a fascination with guns.

Most of the characters in the series are the same as in the game—vaguely helpful but more often than not telling Gordon what they need him to do. Since Gordon is still perceived as a silent protagonist by the game's non-player characters, virtually every one he interacts with does not react to his inner dialogue. He has a tendency to berate the NPCs for perceived offenses against him, as well as verbally assaulting the intelligence of the soldiers and aliens he meets along the way.

Ross Scott describes Gordon's personality as having "shifting paranoia, egomania, mild schizophrenia, over-aggressiveness, petty motivations, and immaturity in general", and that "the only hint I thought they gave to his personality was how proficient he immediately was in weaponry for being a physicist."

Gordon is shown to have a questionable moral compass that impacts his responses to his environment from the start of the series. For example, after a security guard mentions that he is running late in the first episode, Gordon comments that if he is fired, he "could probably jack some office supplies or computer equipment on the way out." Later on in the series, Gordon attempts to rationalize his increasing body count of HECU marines, but eventually drops the pursuit, because "no one's going to believe a few dozen counts of self-defense with a submachine gun."

Filming techniques

Structurally, Freeman's Mind is filmed from the first person perspective of Gordon Freeman. All of the visuals and most of the animations come from the original game; however, many scenes of the series are manipulated through the use of cheats or modifications to the game's engine.

Often in the series, Gordon avoids places where the player is usually forced to go. For example, Gordon performs pull-ups throughout the series to navigate to otherwise inaccessible areas. A typical way to film this is through the use of the noclip mode.

Freeman’s Mind 2 also features modifications to the original maps, adding new or changing existing set pieces and adding entirely new areas.

Spinoff series
The success and popularity of Freeman's Mind led to many other creators adopting a similar format to make Mind series of their own, in other games that feature a silent protagonist in the first-person view. Some of the more notable examples of Mind spinoffs include Shephard's Mind, created by YouTuber Krim, featuring the character Adrian Shephard from the game Half-Life: Opposing Force; Barney's Mind, created by YouTuber IRAMightyPirate, with the character Barney Calhoun from the game Half-Life: Blue Shift; Felix's Mind, created by YouTuber corky064 (since deleted), featuring Gordon Freeman's fictional brother Felix, in the game Half-Life 2: Episode One; Chell's Mind, created by YouTuber CyhAnide, starring as Chell from the game Portal; Kane's Mind, by YouTuber ChunkBoi (formerly CptCool2), featuring the character Matthew Kane from the game Quake 4; and Parker's Mind, by YouTuber LordPsymon, featuring the character Parker from the game Red Faction. These creators all appeared alongside Scott in an interview dubbed "Meeting of the Minds", hosted by Ian Riley, the creator of Barney's Mind, which was posted on Riley's YouTube channel on May 28, 2011.

References

External links 

 
 

Works based on video games
Machinima
Comedy web series
2010s YouTube series
Half-Life (series)
2000s YouTube series
Machinima works